Marc Stewart Danzeisen (born in Riverside, CA, January 17, 1961) is an American drummer and musician. He is best known for his work with Riverdogs, Gilby Clarke, Little Caesar, his contributions to Def Leppard, and his appearance in the 1995 film, The Brady Bunch Movie.

Biography 
In 1990, Danzeisen joined the Epic-associated band Riverdogs. The band featured guitarist Vivian Campbell of Dio and Whitesnake fame. While the album did receive critical acclaim, the band never got the push due to internal issues and ‘restructuring’ at the label. Vivian Campbell left the band to join Def Leppard. Danzeisen left the band to fill in on drums for Geffen Records act, local blues-rock band Little Caesar. The band toured for three weeks in Europe; upon their return to the US, they disbanded.

With session work, Danzeisen stayed busy until 1993. Then his friend of twenty years, Gilby Clarke (Candy, Kills For Thrills, Guns N’ Roses), asked him to join his solo project. After recording months of demos and playing shows in L.A., Gilby landed a solo deal with Virgin Records. In 1994, Danzeisen (drums, backing vocals, harmony vocal and percussion), Gilby (guitar, lead vocals), Will Effertz (bass, backing vocal), Joe ‘Dog‘ Almeida (guitar, slide guitar), and several guest artists went into A&M recording studio A, with producer Waddy Wachtel (guitarist for James Taylor, Keith Richards, Linda Ronstadt, and producer for The Church). The result was Pawnshop Guitars, Gilby's first solo album. After the release, Gilby and band, now featuring guitarist Ryan Roxie (Alice Cooper) in place of Joe ‘Dog’ Almeida, went on tour for a year, as headliners in the US and opening for Aerosmith in South America.

His personal and professional partnership with Vivian Campbell (Def Leppard) has been productive as well. Vivian had Danzeisen play drums and sing harmony/backing vocals on the Tom Petty song “American Girl” from the Def Leppard cover songs CD “Yeah” released through the Walmart chain from 2006. Danzeisen also sang backgrounds on the Def Leppard album Songs From The Sparkle Lounge in 2008.

Film and television work 
In 1995, writer, producer, and guitarist Dave Darling (producer of Brian Setzer, mixer of John Waite's Rough & Tumble album and many other artists) asked Danzeisen to sing backgrounds, and later to assemble a band for The Brady Bunch Movie soundtrack. Danzeisen was the drummer, Roger Joseph Manning, Jr. (Jellyfish) played keyboards, Sheldon Strickland bass, Eric Dover (Jellyfish) guitar, and Dave Darling was vocalist. "Mud Pagoda" was the fictitious band's name on the soundtrack album. The band appeared in the film, as the backing band for Davy Jones, who performed an updated version of his hit, "Girl".

In 2000, Danzeisen was asked to join the studio band for the short-lived Comedy Central game show Don't Forget Your Toothbrush. The host was comedian Mark Curry. The band consisted of two horn players, a percussionist, bassist, guitarist, keyboardist, and Danzeisen on drums. The band was well-rounded in every genre of music. The show lasted 23 episodes before being cancelled.

Danzeisen has also composed for films, including the title track for the indie film Letter From Home (2000), and the song "See Yourself" for He's Such a Girl (2009).

Discography and credits

Major label releases
1985 Francis X and the Bushmen, Soul Incest - drums 
1985 Touch, Rocky IV soundtrack, MGM/Scotty Brothers Records - drums
1994 Gilby Clarke, Pawnshop Guitars, Virgin Records - drums, backing vocals, percussion
1994 Greg Chaisson, It’s About Time, Graceland Records - percussion, backing vocals
1995 Gilby Clarke, Blooze EP, Virgin Japan - drums, backing vocals
1997 Die Happy, Frontline Records - percussion
2001 Michelle Bradford Jones Warner Brothers Australia - drums
2006 Def Leppard, Yeah bonus CD, Island / Universal Music Group - drums, harmony vocals
2007 Suzie McNeil, Broken and Beautiful, Universal Canada - drums
2011 Riverdogs, World Gone Mad, Melodic Rock Records - drums, backing vocals

Independent/iTunes releases
1996 Powerslide, Peel, PSM Records - drums, vocals, guitars, bass
1999 Bijou Phillips, Almo Music - drums, drum loops
2000 Derek Spent, Walking Dichotomy - drums
2001 Little Friend, Living Room Records - drums, guitar, bass
2006 Brewer & Chase - drums, bass, electric guitar
2006 Kellie Rucker, Ain’t Hit Bottom- drums
2006 Four Star Mary, Hello It’s Me, MSG Records - drums
2006 Roxie77, peace, love, and Armageddon - harmony, backing vocals
2012 Big Mick and the Curl, Not Of This Surf - drums

Solo/independent albums
1996 Powerslide, Peel, PSM Records - guitar, bass, drums, vocals, production
2008 Marc Danzeisen Absorbent, PSM Records - all instruments, production
2010 Marc Danzeisen Released, PSM Records - all instruments, production

Production/mixing
1996 Powerslide, Peel, PSM Records
1997 Revolux
1999 My Sister Amazing
2000 Moaning Lisa, Wonderful, Veronica Records
2000 Mass Confusion
2003 Appleseed, Forever And A Day
2006 Brewer & Chase
2008 Desecrate
2011 Riverdogs, World Gone Mad (one of four producers)

TV/film/commercials
1994 The Brady Bunch Movie, Paramount Pictures - drums in Davy Jones’ band
1994-96 Mad About You, Paramount Television - drums on soundtrack
1994 Towner Mini Vans Korean commercial - composer/producer
1995 Clueless, Paramount Pictures - drums on soundtrack
1995 Countdown Clothing Korean commercial - composer/producer
1999 CBS Television Los Angeles - movie of the week composer
2000 Don't Forget Your Toothbrush, Comedy Central/ Buena Vista 23 episodes - drums in show band
2005-06 ADS Post Los Angeles - movie trailer composer
2007 Elektrofilms Post Burbank - movie trailer composer

Music videos
Riverdogs, "Toy Soldier"  - Epic Associated - Sony Music
Little Caesar, "Stand Up" - Geffen Records
Gilby Clarke, "Cure Me or Kill Me," "Tijuana Jail," "Johanna's Chopper" - Virgin Records

Tours/appearances
1982 The Flames, Southern California – several shows
1983-84 Ashes, Southern California – one year
1985 Francis X and the Bushmen, EMI/FM Revolver Records Tour – one year
1987 Bulletboys, Southern California shows – six months
1990 Riverdogs, Epic Associated/Sony Records Tour – eight months
1992 Little Caesar, Geffen Records “Influence” tour – six months
1995 Gilby Clarke, Pawnshop Guitars, Virgin Records world tour – one year
1996-96 House Of Blues Band Foundation's band for education of the blues
1998-2001 Rondor Music Publishing House, drummer for artist sessions
2000 Agent Orange, Southern California – several shows 
2004 Riverdogs, Southern California - four reunion shows

Drums/endorsements
Several drum sets and snare drums from 1940s Slingerland“Radio Kings.”  One is a 1938 Ludwig & Ludwig snare drum that belonged to drumming legend Gene Krupa.  He also owns Mapex, Gretsch, Ludwig & Ludwig, Leedy, Ludwig, Fibes, Corder, Darwin, and DDC (Danzeisen Drum Co) of various years.

1987 – present, endorsed by Zildjian cymbals and drumsticks

Live drum set
Danzeisen Drum Company
14x26 bass
8x12 Rack Tom or 9x13
15x16 Floor Tom
16x18 Floor Tom (when needed)
5x14 Snare or 6x14 Snare
14” A-Custom Hi-Hats
17” A-Custom Fast Crash
18” A-Custom Fast Crash
21” A-Custom Ride or 22” K-Light Ride
8” Avedis Zildjian -Splash

Studio drum sets
Fibes-Corder
16x24 Bass Drum
9x13 Rack Tom
16x16 Floor Tom
5x14 Snare Drum

Mapex 1995 Orion Series
16x22 Bass Drum
8x10 Rack tom
9x12 Rack Tom
14x16 Floor Tom
16x16 Floor Tom
4-1/2x13 Steel Snare

References

External links
 
 

1961 births
Living people
20th-century American drummers
American male drummers
20th-century American male musicians